The dégradation nationale ("National demotion") was a sentence introduced in France after the Liberation of France. It was applied during the épuration légale ("legal purge") which followed the fall of the Vichy regime.

The dégradation nationale was one of the sentences available to the Courts of Justice. It was meant to punish offences of Indignité nationale ("national unworthiness").

Individuals sentenced to the dégradation nationale lost their political, civil and professional rights. They effectively became second-class citizens.

Criminal definition 
The crime of indignité nationale involves having "after June 16 1940, knowingly either aided, directly or indirectly, Germany or its allies in France or abroad, or having attacked the unity of the Nation, or the liberty of the French people, or the equality between them" 

Under the ordinance of December 26, 1944, belonging to certain political parties or movements (such as the Milice), participation in certain acts (such as public speech in favor of Nazi Germany or its ideals) or the exercise of certain functions (such as higher ranking employees in the propaganda services or the Commissariat-General for Jewish Affairs) demonstrated the crime of indignité nationale.

Usage from 1944 to 1951 
There were 50,223 primary cases of dégradation nationale (3,578 through the Courts of Justice and 46,645 through the Civic Chambers). A total of approximately 100,000 people were sentenced to dégradation nationale in primary and accessory roles, making it the most applied legal penalty of the immediate postwar period. 

Notable among the condemned were Philippe Pétain, Pierre Laval, Charles Maurras, and Louis-Ferdinand Céline.

Use of the penalty was generally suspended following the Law of Amnesty of 1951.

Continued usage after 1951

Algerian War 
The use of charges of indignité nationale restarted during the Algerian War. Several "suitcase carriers" of the Jeanson network were sentenced long after 1951, not for having aided "Germany or its allies," but for having "attacked the unity of the Nation, or the liberty of the French people, or the equality between them."

January 2015 attacks 
After the January 2015 Île-de-France attacks, French President François Hollande considered the possibility of reviving indignité nationale as a penalty for French citizens who contribute to a terrorist attack. After deputy Philippe Meunier of the UMP previously brought the idea before the National Assembly in November 2014, it was taken up again by Nathalie Kosciusko-Morizet and Anne Hidalgo. Marine Le Pen declared herself against the idea, calling it a "gadget measure".

Socialist deputy Jean-Jacques Urvoas, author of a 2015 parliamentary report on the issue, declared himself for a dégradation républicaine ("Republican demotion") instead of indignité nationale.

References

Punishments
Law of France